Anthony Wong Chau-sang (born Anthony William Perry; 2 September 1961) is a Hong Kong film actor and singer. He has worked with many significant directors of Hong Kong cinema since his debut in 1985, including John Woo, Andrew Lau, Ringo Lam and Johnnie To, and is known for his intense portrayals of often-amoral characters. He has won the Hong Kong Film Award for Best Actor three times: for The Untold Story (1993), Beast Cops (1998) and Still Human (2018). 

He is best known to international audiences for his roles as Triad gangster Johnny Wong in Hard Boiled (1992), police Superintendent Wong Chi-shing Infernal Affairs trilogy (2002-03) and General Yang in the Hollywood film The Mummy: Tomb of the Dragon Emperor (2008).

Early life 
Wong was born Anthony William Perry on 2 September 1961 to a Hong Kong Chinese mother Wong Juen Yee, and an English father, Frederick William Perry (1914 – 1988), who served with the Royal Air Force during World War II and later as a colonial officer. Frederick Perry walked out on the family when Wong was four, so he lived with his mother "in the staircase of a pre-war building in Wan Chai" until he was sent to live with various relatives for two years while his mother "held down three jobs." He kept in touch with his father through letters until they lost contact when he was 12 years old, and he knew that he had three older half-siblings from his father's marriage. He met his half-brothers in 2018.

In his acting career, Wong's established a reputation for openly critiquing the Hong Kong film industry and its practices, actors' performances and pop culture in interviews and his personal microblog. In some of those critiques, he revealed his experiences of being bullied and discriminated against—for being a "mixed race foreigner" and "during the 1960s, English-Chinese mixed race people like me were regarded as bastards" and for being born outside Hong Kong—while growing up in Hong Kong and during the early years of his acting career.

During his late teens, Wong moved to the United Kingdom to attend a college of further education. He returned to Hong Kong to attend a training course in hairdressing until he quit to join Asia Television's (ATV) training programme when he was 21.

Career 
After completing ATV's training programme, he continued his training at The Hong Kong Academy for Performing Arts. He had stated in an interview that his mixed ethnicity initially caused him to be typecast as a villain, due to institutionalised racism in the Hong Kong film industry during this period. He, however, won a Hong Kong Film Award for his performance as a real-life serial killer, who made meat buns from his victims' flesh, in The Untold Story in 1993.

In the following years, Wong appeared in a wide range of genre films including Rock n' Roll Cop, Hard Boiled, The Heroic Trio, Infernal Affairs, The Mission and The Medallion. He had also several appearances in the popular Young and Dangerous film series as Tai Fei; a rival Triad gangster to Ekin Cheng's character Chan Ho-nam, an ambitious Triad gangster, whom Tai Fei eventually befriends.

Wong had also appeared in a number of international English-language films including The Painted Veil and The Mummy: Tomb of the Dragon Emperor.

In 1995, Wong made his directorial debut with The New Tenant.

In 2014, Wong made his culinary debut in Dinner Confidential, where he would prepare one dish out of a table d'hote candle-lit dinner menu for guests.

In 2015, Wong became the first Hong Kong actor to have won the best lead actor role award in TV and movies when he won 2015 TVB Anniversary Awards for Best Actor and Best Drama for Lord of Shanghai, marking his triumphant return to TVB. He also became the first Hong Kong actor to have won Best Actor awards in films, stage theatre and TV. He also became the first Hong Kong actor to ever win TVB's Best Actor award on his first nomination.

In May 2020, Wong travelled to Taiwan for his role in the Public Television Service (PTS) drama Heaven on the Fourth Floor.

Personal life 
Wong married Jane Ng Wai Zing in 1996 and they have two sons, Wong Yat Yat (born 1996) and Ulysses Wong (born 1998). Wong is taking care of his mother who now has dementia, while his sons now live outside of Hong Kong. In June 2018, it was revealed that he had a son named William (born 1998), with a woman known only as "Joyce" who is the niece of veteran actor and producer John Shum.

In March 2018, Wong met his half-brothers, twins John William and David Frederick Perry, after a BBC story on Wong's search for his family was published. He also has a half-sister, Vera Ann. His father died in 1988 in Australia, where he and his first family settled after they left Hong Kong. His half-siblings did not know of Wong's existence until the BBC story was produced.

In a 2005 interview with Star eCentral, Wong stated that amongst his prolific output during the 1980s and the 1990s, a considerable number of films he appeared in were "terrible." However, he does not regret making those films, as he needed the money to support his family.

Wong is a supporter of the 2014 Umbrella Movement, a series of pro-democracy protests in Hong Kong. This has reportedly led to limited acting opportunities for him in mainland China. He has also voiced support for the 2019–20 Hong Kong protests.

Wong travelled to Taiwan in May 2020, which fuelled speculation that he was moving to the island. However, Wong later revealed he was there for a filming commitment, nonetheless describing Taiwan's handling of the COVID-19 pandemic as "excellent" and expressing interest in staying long term. On 18 April 2021, Wong was approved for an Employment Gold Card, allowing him to work in Taiwan without needing to apply in advance. It also allows him to receive tax incentives and National Health Insurance.

Filmography

Film
{| class="wikitable sortable" 
! Year !! Title !! Role
|-
| 1985 || My Name Ain't Suzie || Jimmy Koch
|-
| 1990 || When Fortune Smiles || Wei
|-
| 1990 || No Risk, No Gain: Casino Raiders - The Sequel || Yeung Sing
|-
| 1990 || Dancing Bull || Ngau Ban-tsiu
|-
| 1990 || The Big Score || Ma Kwan
|-
| 1991 || Erotic Ghost Story II || Ng Tung/Chau-sang
|-
| 1991 || Don't Fool Me || Nerd's brother Su
|-
| 1991 || Casino Raiders II || Pow
|-
| 1992 || Sting of the Scorpion || Chow Kin
|-
| 1992 || Now You See Love, Now You Don't || Dunno
|-
| 1992 || What a Hero! || Saucer
|-
| 1992 || Hard Boiled || Johnny Wong
|-
| 1992 || Lucky Encounter || Cheap Chan
|-
| 1992 || Full Contact (1992) || Sam Sei
|-
| 1992 || Angel Hunter || Kwok/The Bishop
|-
| 1993 || Rong shi qi an || Lau
|-
| 1993 || Biao jie, ni hao ye! III zhi da ren jia dao || Inspector Lu Ping
|-
| 1993 || Fight Back to School III || Tailor Lam
|-
| 1993 || The Heroic Trio || Kau
|-
| 1993 || Fu gui kuang hua ||
|-
| 1993 || Huang Fei Hong dui Huang Fei Hong ||
|-
| 1993 || The Eight Immortals Restaurant: The Untold Story || Wong Chi Hang
|-
| 1993 || 3 Days of a Blind Girl || Sam Chu
|-
| 1993 || A Moment of Romance II || Dino
|-
| 1993 || The Mad Monk || Nine Lives Beggar
|-
| 1993 || Cheng shi nu lie ren || Charlie Chan
|-
| 1993 || Executioners || Mr. Kim/The Faceless Monster/Kau
|-
| 1993 || Di shi pan guan || Kin
|-
| 1993 || Daughter of Darkness || Officer Lui
|-
| 1993 || Love to Kill || Sam Wai Wong
|-
| 1994 || Bomb Disposal Officer: Baby Bomb || John Wu
|-
| 1994 || Meng chai ren ||
|-
| 1994 || Oh! My Three Guys || Best Actor Winner
|-
| 1994 || Ti tian xing dao zhi sha xiong || The prosecutor
|-
| 1994 || Xiang Gang qi an: Zhi xi xue gui li wang || Tong Chi-Ming
|-
| 1994 || Yi xian sheng ji || Inspector Kim Kuo-Hao
|-
| 1994 || Organized Crime & Triad Bureau || Ho Kin Tung
|-
| 1994 || Guang Dong wu hu zhi tie quan wu di Sun Zhong Shan ||
|-
| 1994 || [[Rock N'Roll Cop|'Saang Gong yat ho tung chap faan]] || Inspector Hung
|-
| 1994 || Gui mi xin qiao || Liu Sheng-Ming
|-
| 1994 || Guai xia yi zhi mei ||
|-
| 1995 || Er yue san shi || Raymond Shiu Chi-Li
|-
| 1995 || Hai shi jue de ni zui hao || Wah Tino
|-
| 1995 || Jie fang chai ren || Lau
|-
| 1995 || Ma lu ying xiong II: Fei fa sai che || Doctor
|-
| 1995 || Xin fang ke || Alan Tam
|-
| 1995 || The World of Treasure ||
|-
| 1996 || Tou tou ai ni ||
|-
| 1996 || Mongkok Story || Lui Lone
|-
| 1996 || Xiu hua da dao ||
|-
| 1996 || Jing hua rou bo jiang jian dang ||
|-
| 1996 || Jin zhuang xiang jiao ju le bu || Host/Inspector Wong/Mr. Shaw/John
|-
| 1996 || Zhong guo 'O' ji zhi xie xing qing ren || Li Shu-pei
|-
| 1996 || Young and Dangerous 2 || Tai Fai
|-
| 1996 || Ebola Syndrome || Kai San
|-
| 1996 || Big Bullet || Bird
|-
| 1996 || Young and Dangerous 3 || Tai Fai
|-
| 1996 || Black Mask || King Kau
|-
| 1996 || Viva Erotica || Wong
|-
| 1997 || Armageddon || Chiu Tai-Pang
|-
| 1997 || Hui zhuan shou shi || Shing
|-
| 1997 || Young and Dangerous 4 || Tai Fai
|-
| 1997 || Huo shao dao zhi heng hang Ba dao ||
|-
| 1997 || Ng yun ji dai ||
|-
| 1997 || Option Zero || Sing
|-
| 1998 || The Untold Story 2 || Officer Lazyboots
|-
| 1998 || Haunted Mansion || Ah Gi's Husband
|-
| 1998 || God.com ||
|-
| 1998 || The Demon's Baby || Chin Hai-Ching Hoi
|-
| 1998 || Young and Dangerous 5 || Tai Fei
|-
| 1998 || Beast Cops || Tung
|-
| 1998 || Quan zhi da dao ||
|-
| 1998 || The Storm Riders || Sword Saint
|-
| 1998 || Jiang jian xian jing || Wong Lik-Tak
|-
| 1999 || Raped by an Angel 4: The Raper's Union || Human Milk Drinking Doctor
|-
| 1999 || Wai Goh dik goo si ||
|-
| 1999 || A Lamb in Despair || Charles
|-
| 1999 || Hak do fung wan ji sau chuk wong || Chiu-chau Tsam
|-
| 1999 || Fascination Amour || Eric
|-
| 1999 || Ordinary Heroes || Peter Kam
|-
| 1999 || Gou hun e meng ||
|-
| 1999 || A Man Called Hero || Pride
|-
| 1999 || Heaven of Hope || Ah-Wah
|-
| 1999 || Baan gwat chai ||
|-
| 1999 || Hei she hui dang an zhi hei jin di guo ||
|-
| 1999 || Century of the Dragon || Lam
|-
| 1999 || The Deadly Camp || Boar
|-
| 1999 || The Mission || Curtis
|-
| 1999 || The Legendary 'Tai Fei' || Tai Fei
|-
| 2000 || Violent Cop || Tai Pan Kim
|-
| 2000 || Evil Fade ||
|-
| 2000 || Nu nan jue ||
|-
| 2000 || Fist Power || Charles Chau
|-
| 2000 || Those Were the Days... || Dai Fei
|-
| 2000 || Q gei luen yan || Lam
|-
| 2000 || Yau sau tung dong ||
|-
| 2000 || What Is a Good Teacher || ching
|-
| 2000 || Time and Tide || Uncle Ji
|-
| 2000 || Jiang hu: The Triad Zone || Master Kwan Wan Cheung
|-
| 2000 || Miu meng ji tiu || Wisdom
|-
| 2000 || Ai wo bie zou || Rock
|-
| 2000 || Metade Fumaca ||
|-
| 2000 || Gen-X Cops 2: Metal Mayhem || Dr. Tang
|-
| 2001 || United We Stand and Swim || Coach Mao
|-
| 2001 || Yuk mong ji shing ||
|-
| 2001 || Runaway || Ray
|-
| 2001 || Visible Secret || Wong-Lin
|-
| 2001 || My Life as McDull || School Principal (voice) and Logan (voice)
|-
| 2002 || Gwaai sau hok yuen ||
|-
| 2002 || Roaring Dragon, Bluffing Tiger ||
|-
| 2002 || Yi wen ji bao biao || Peter's Dad
|-
| 2002 || Seung fei || Joker's Father
|-
| 2002 || Just One Look || Crazy
|-
| 2002 || Demi-Haunted || Hung
|-
| 2002 || Infernal Affairs || SP Wong Chi Shing
|-
| 2003 || Love Under the Sun ||
|-
| 2003 || Cat and Mouse || Judge Bao Zheng
|-
| 2003 || The Twins Effect || Prada
|-
| 2003 || Kap sze moon yat goh gei kooi || Anthony
|-
| 2003 || Colour of the Truth || S.P. Wong Jiang
|-
| 2003 || The Medallion || Lester
|-
| 2003 || Fu bo ||
|-
| 2003 || Infernal Affairs II || Inspector Wong Chi Shing
|-
| 2003 || Infernal Affairs III || SP Wong Chi Shing
|-
| 2003 || Golden Chicken 2 || Chow
|-
| 2004 || Magic Kitchen || Tony Ho
|-
| 2004 || 20 30 40 || Shi Ge
|-
| 2004 || McDull, Prince de la Bun || principal (voice)
|-
| 2004 || A-1 Headline || Lam Hei Fei
|-
| 2004 || Kung Fu Soccer (TV series) || Lam Chung Fu
|-
| 2005 || Slim till Dead || Sergeant Tak
|-
| 2005 || House of Fury || Yue Siu Bo
|-
| 2005 || 2 Young || Nam's Pop
|-
| 2005 || Initial D || Bunta 'Tofuman' Fujiwara
|-
| 2005 || Mob Sister || Whacko
|-
| 2005 || All About Love ||
|-
| 2006 || McDull, the Alumni ||
|-
| 2006 || Isabella || Chen-Shing's boss
|-
| 2006 || On the Edge || Lung
|-
| 2006 || Exiled || blazed
|-
| 2006 || The Painted Veil || Colonel Yu
|-
| 2007 || Sweet Revenge || Ching Shing
|-
| 2007 || Dancing Lion || Great Uncle
|-
| 2007 || Mr. Cinema || Zhou Heung Kong
|-
| 2007 || Simply Actors || Theatre janitor
|-
| 2007 || Secret || Chiu
|-
| 2007 || The Sun Also Rises || Teacher Liang
|-
| 2007 || Bullet and Brain || Brain
|-
| 2008 || The Mummy: Tomb of the Dragon Emperor || General Yang
|-
| 2008 || Plastic City || Yuda
|-
| 2008 || Ying han || Dragon
|-
| 2008 || True Women for Sale || Lau Fu-yi
|-
| 2009 || I Corrupt All Cops || Unicorn Tang
|-
| 2009 || Vengeance || Kwai
|-
| 2009 || McDull, Kung Fu Kindergarten || Principal/Master/Xiongbao (voice)
|-
| 2009 || Turning Point || Brother one
|-
| 2009 || The Last Night of Madam Chin || Cheng Rong-fa
|-
| 2010 || Legend of the Fist: The Return of Chen Zhen || Liu Yutian
|-
| 2011 || Punished || Wong Ho-chiu
|-
| 2011 || A Beautiful Life ||
|-
| 2011 || A Simple Life || Grasshopper - Elderly home's owner
|-
| 2011 || The Woman Knight of Mirror Lake ||
|-
| 2011 || White Vengeance || Fan Zeng
|-
| 2012 || Motorway || Lo
|-
| 2012 || McDull: The Pork of Music || principal
|-
| 2012 || The Four || Zhuge Zhenwo
|-
| 2012 || Naked Soldier ||
|-
| 2012 || Westgate Tango ||
|-
| 2013 || Ip Man: The Final Fight || Ip Man
|-
| 2013 || The Four II ||
|-
| 2014 || Golden Chicken 3 ||
|-
| 2014 || The Four III ||
|-
| 2014 || McDull: Me & My Mum ||
|-
| 2014 || Gangster Payday ||
|-
| 2015 || Hot Blood Band ||
|-
| 2015 || 12 Golden Ducks ||
|-
| 2016 || The Mobfathers ||
|-
| 2016 || McDull: Rise of the Rice Cooker ||
|-
| 2017 || Cook Up a Storm || Mountain Ko
|-
| 2017 || The Sleep Curse || 
|-
| 2017 || 77 Heartbreaks || 
|-
| 2018 || Still Human || 
|-
| 2019 ||A Home with a View||
|-
| 2019 || Declared Legally Dead ||
|-
| 2022 || The Sunny Side of the Street||
|-
| TBA || Initial D 2|| Bunta Fujiwara 
|}

 Television series
 War of The Dragon  (1989), Cheung King-to
 The Justice of Life  (1989), Johnson Man Chung-sun
 When Things Get Tough 午夜太陽 (1990), Tsing Kwan
 The Witness of Time 天若有情 (1990), Hua Jing Sheng (程华京生)
 ICAC Investigators 2004 廉政行動2004 (2004), ICAC Chief Investigator Antonio Wong
 Kung Fu Soccer 功夫足球 (2004), Lam Chung Fu
 Eight Heroes 八大豪侠 (2005), Yan Tiexin
 Fox Volant of the Snowy Mountain 雪山飞狐 (2006), Hu Yidao
 The Legend of the Condor Heroes 射鵰英雄傳 (2008), Huang Yaoshi
 Memoirs of Madam Jin 金大班 (2009), Chen Rongfa
 The Legend of Yang Guifei 杨贵妃秘史 (2010), Emperor Xuanzong of Tang
 Chu Han Zhengxiong 楚汉争雄 (2012), Liu Bang
 Lord of Shanghai 梟雄 (2015), Kiu Ngo-tin
 Margaret & David - Ex 瑪嘉烈與大衛系列 前度 (2017), Sham Joi-san
 Strangers (2018), David Chen
 Stained 心冤 (2018; aired in early 2019), Wayne Lau
 The Republic 理想国 (2019), Sim Lap-ki	
 Heaven on the Fourth Floor (Taiwanese TV series) 四楼的天堂 (2021), Tien Yi (天意)

 Theater 
 Equus (May 2014)
 Le Dieu Du Carnage (August 2015)
 Le Dieu Du Carnage (Re-run - January 2016)
 Le Dieu Du Carnage (Huayi - Chinese Festival of Arts - February 2016)
 A Midsummer Night's Dream (September 2016)
 A Midsummer Night's Dream (Huayi Chinese Festival of Arts - February 2017)
 Speed-the-Plow'' (September 2017)

Awards and nominations

References

External links

 Anthony Wong bio
 Anthony Wong (sound & video)
 13 Stupid Questions for Anthony Wong

1961 births
Living people
Alumni of The Hong Kong Academy for Performing Arts
Hong Kong male film actors
Hong Kong male television actors
Hong Kong male stage actors
20th-century Hong Kong male actors
21st-century Hong Kong male actors
Hong Kong people of English descent
Hong Kong expatriates in Taiwan